Adamantyl-THPINACA (ATHPINACA, AD-THPINACA) is an indazole-based synthetic cannabinoid, which was first reported to Europol in Slovenia in January 2015. It is known as both the 1-adamantyl and 2-adamantyl isomers (SGT-40 and SGT-194 respectively), which can be distinguished by GC-EI-MS. It is banned in Sweden and Russia. Both the 1-adamantyl and 2-adamantyl isomers are specifically listed as illegal drugs in Japan. Given the known metabolic liberation (and presence as an impurity) of amantadine in the related compound APINACA, it is suspected that metabolic hydrolysis of the amide group of Adamantyl-THPINACA may also release amantadine.

See also 

 5F-ADB
 5F-AMB
 5F-APICA
 AB-CHMINACA
 AB-FUBINACA
 AB-CHFUPYCA
 AB-PINACA
 ADB-CHMINACA
 ADB-FUBINACA
 ADB-PINACA
 APICA
 APINACA
 APP-FUBINACA
 CUMYL-THPINACA
 MDMB-CHMINACA
 MDMB-FUBINACA
 PX-3

References 

Adamantanes
Cannabinoids
Amines
Designer drugs

Indazolecarboxamides